Smiling Faces is an American musical with music by Harry Revel, lyrics by Mack Gordon, and a musical book by Harry Clarke. Produced by Lee Shubert and Jacob J. Shubert, the production opened on Broadway at the Shubert Theatre where it ran from August 30, 1932, through September 24, 1932, for a total of 31 performances.

External links
 

1932 musicals
Broadway musicals